This is a list of events held and scheduled by the Ultimate Fighting Championship (UFC), a mixed martial arts promotion based in the United States. UFC's first event, UFC 1, took place on November 12, 1993. Each UFC event contains several fights. Traditionally, every event starts off with a preliminary card followed by a main card, with the last fight being known as the main event.

Overview
UFC events are separated into nine different formats:
"Numbered" events, currently airing on pay-per-view, with some exceptions
"Fight Night" events, currently airing on ESPN+, formerly aired on Spike, Fox Sports 1, Fox Sports 2 or UFC Fight Pass. 
"The Ultimate Fighter Finale" events, currently airing on ESPN+, formerly aired on Spike, FX, Fox Sports 1 or UFC Fight Pass. 
"UFC on ABC" events, currently airing on ABC
"UFC on ESPN" events, currently airing on ESPN
"UFC on Fox" events, formerly aired on Fox
"UFC on FX" events, formerly aired on FX
"UFC on Fuel TV" events, formerly aired on Fuel TV
"UFC Live" events, formerly aired on Versus

Most of the "numbered" events have taken place on pay-per-view, though there have been a few exceptions for reasons such as tape-delay. Events such as UFC 72, which took place in Belfast, Northern Ireland, were sold on pay-per-view, but due to tape-delay, purchase rates were not as high as events that aired at a traditional starting time. As such, events taking part in significantly different time zones, including UFC 70, UFC 75, UFC 89, UFC 95, UFC 105, UFC 120, UFC 122, and UFC 138, were given a same-night airing in U.S. prime time on Spike.

Historically, the UFC has also aired preliminary fights prior to the main fight cards, either on television via Spike, FX, and Fuel TV, or online via Facebook and YouTube. Beginning in August 2013, starting with UFC Fight Night: Shogun vs. Sonnen, the UFC began airing non-PPV events on either Fox Sports 1 or Fox Sports 2. In January 2014, as part of the organization's global expansion, the UFC began airing various international events exclusively on their subscription-based digital network, UFC Fight Pass.

In July 2009, the UFC held its unofficial 100th "numbered event"; however, officially, despite being called UFC 100, it was actually the 101st numbered event (not to mention the 133rd event overall). The UFC signed a deal with Fox Sports Net, after Fox agreed to broadcast one fight in June 2002, during its "All-Star Summer" that month. UFC 37 and 38 had already been scheduled and promoted, but as UFC 38 was the promotion's debut in the United Kingdom, they created UFC 37.5; an event that became the first ever mixed martial arts fight available on cable television.

As of UFC 286: Edwards vs. Usman 3, which took place on March 18, 2023, there have been 640 UFC events held in 165 cities in 29 countries.

Other events
In May 2017, the UFC announced White would hold Dana White's Tuesday Night Contender Series weekly on UFC Fight Pass (becoming, from January 2019 on, exclusive content on ESPN+ in the United States). As with the earlier web series Looking for a Fight, the goal of the series is for White to scout talent for the UFC. It was stated ahead of the license being approved that “this is not the UFC, this is not the UFC brand,” but instead a promotion that will allow up and coming fighters the chance to showcase their talents in hopes that one day they may compete in the UFC.

Scheduled events

Past events

Number of events by year
As of UFC 286: Edwards vs. Usman 3

Event locations
The following cities have hosted a total of 640 UFC events as of UFC 286: Edwards vs. Usman 3

See also 

List of current UFC fighters
List of UFC bonus award recipients

References

External links

UFC
UFC